The 1963 Daytona 500, the 5th running of the event held on February 24, 1963, was won by Tiny Lund driving a 1963 Ford.  Lund drove his number 21 to victory in three hours and 17 minutes.  There were 2 cautions flags which slowed the race for 10 laps.

Lund won by making only four pit stops, but he would not have been able to make the distance on four pit stops had the first ten laps not been run under caution to dry the track from earlier rains. Had the race not started under caution, Lund would have had to make five pit stops, just as Fred Lorenzen and Ned Jarrett did. He was able to win on four pit stops along because of the slow start time.

Race report
Lund filled in for an injured Marvin Panch, who suffered injuries after a crash in a Maserati. Panch was to drive a Wood Brothers car in the 500.  The win was Lund's first victory of the season.

Jim Cushman, Bubba Farr, Dick Good, Ted Hairfield, and John Rogers retired from professional stock car racing after this event. Drivers who failed to qualify for the race were: Bobby Isaac (#99), Buck Baker (#87), Pete Stewart (#57), Cale Yarborough (#52), Larry Thomas (#36), Roy Mayne (#33), Chuck Daigh (#25), Rodger Ward (#16), Al Terrell (#9) and Bill Foster (#2).

First Daytona 500 starts for LeeRoy Yarbrough, H. B. Bailey, Stick Elliott, Wendell Scott, A. J. Foyt, Jim Hurtubise, and Bob Cooper. Only Daytona 500 starts for Troy Ruttman, Bob James, Red Foote, Len Sutton, Floyd Powell, Frank Graham, John Rogers, Dick Good, Bubba Farr, and Ted Hairfield. Last Daytona 500 starts for Nelson Stacy, Joe Weatherly, Tommy Irwin, Rex White, Ed Livingston, Jim Cushman, Herman Beam, Jim McGuirk, and Jack Smith.

Parnelli Jones, at the wheel of Bill Stroppe's factory-backed Mercury, comes home 15th in the second of his three Daytona 500 appearances. While a great finish wasn't in the cards here about three months later Jones would go on to win the Indianapolis 500. 

The transition to purpose-built racecars began in the early 1960s and occurred gradually over that decade.  Changes made to the sport by the late 1960s brought an end to the "strictly stock" vehicles of the 1950s.

This race marked the first time that ABC's Wide World of Sports covered the race. It also helped to dispel the long-standing stereotypes of the Southern United States after the rest of the United States witnessed an emotional inspiring win.

Top 10 finishers

References 

Daytona 500
Daytona 500
Daytona 500
NASCAR races at Daytona International Speedway